Marghesh is a village in Kakhk Rural District, Kakhk District, Gonabad County, Razavi Khorasan Province, Iran. At the 2006 census, its population was 104, in 40 families.

References 

Populated places in Gonabad County